Réservoir-Dozois is an unorganized territory in the Abitibi-Témiscamingue region of Quebec, Canada. It is the largest of five unorganized territories in the La Vallée-de-l'Or Regional County Municipality and entirely part of the La Vérendrye Wildlife Reserve.

It is named after the Dozois Reservoir, a large reservoir which formed after the construction of the Bourque Dam on the Ottawa River in 1949.

Demographics
Population:
 Population in 1991: 115
 Population in 1996: 0
 Population in 2011: 0
 Population in 2001: 0
 Population in 2006: 0

References

External links

Unorganized territories in Abitibi-Témiscamingue